is a Game Boy Advance puzzle game by Japanese developer Hudson Soft with design elements by Framegraphics of Japan in courtesy of Super Lovers. It also released its version for mobile phones in Japan. The gameplay can be described as a mix of Picross and Minesweeper, whereas the design is similar to that of Super Milk Chan.

External links
Official page (Japanese)   Translated by Excite.co.jp

2001 video games
Game Boy Advance games
Game Boy Advance-only games
Hudson Soft games
Japan-exclusive video games
Mobile games
Puzzle video games
Video games developed in Japan